Briggs is a lunar impact crater that is located in the western part of the Oceanus Procellarum, to the east of the large walled plain Struve. It lies to the northeast of the walled plain Eddington, and north-northwest of the crater Seleucus. The isolated position of this crater on the mare, near the northwestern limb of the Moon, makes it relatively easy for an Earth-bound observer to locate. The crater is named after the English mathematician Henry Briggs.

The outer rim of Briggs is not quite circular, with outward bulges to the north-northeast and southward. At the midpoint of the crater floor is a central ridge, extending to the north.

Satellite craters
By convention these features are identified on lunar maps by placing the letter on the side of the crater midpoint that is closest to Briggs.

References

External links
 

Impact craters on the Moon